United Kingdom has taken many forms of censorship throughout the history of the country, with either various stringent and lax laws in place at different times, especially concerning British cinema, entertainment venues, literature, the monarchy and the press. In a specific sense,  the concept of free speech generally does not exist as a fundamental right within the country. British citizens have a negative right to freedom of expression under the common law. In 1998, the United Kingdom incorporated the European Convention into its domestic law under the Human Rights Act, although a repeal has been proposed, with a replacement known as the Bill of Rights Bill 2022 announced with draft text on 22 June 2022.

Even under the current Human Rights Act, there is a broad sweep of exceptions. They include threatening or abusive words or behaviour intending or likely to cause harassment, alarm or distress or cause a breach of the peace, sending another any article which is indecent or grossly offensive with an intent to cause distress or anxiety, incitement, incitement to racial hatred, incitement to religious hatred, incitement to terrorism including encouragement of terrorism and dissemination of terrorist publications, glorifying terrorism, collection or possession of a document or record containing information likely to be of use to a terrorist, treason, sedition, obscenity, indecency including corruption of public morals and outraging public decency, defamation, prior restraint, restrictions on court reporting including names of victims and evidence and prejudicing or interfering with court proceedings, prohibition of post-trial interviews with jurors, time, manner, and place restrictions, harassment, privileged communications, trade secrets, classified material, copyright, patents, military conduct, and limitations on commercial speech such as advertising.

As of 2022, the United Kingdom is ranked 35th on the Press Freedom Index.

Ministry of Information
The Ministry of Information was created during the First World War and then reformed for the Second World War for propaganda purposes. In the Second World War it was located at the Senate House of the University of London. During the Second World War it was infamous for having a staff of 999.

The Ministry was responsible for keeping much information out of the public domain during the war years, as it was thought that this would have been harmful to the national sentiment. It also censored many press reports that were not deemed to be sufficiently patriotic, or that listed military operations to a level of detail that could be used by the enemy.

The Ministry took over the General Post Office Film Unit, renaming it the Crown Film Unit. It produced documentaries such as Target for Tonight (1941), Western Approaches (1944) and London Can Take It! (1940). It also created a feature-length fictional film; 49th Parallel (1941). Following this it solely created documentaries, although it also laid down propaganda guidelines for commercial films.

The Ministry was disbanded following the end of the Second World War.

Laws on obscenity and sexual content
Obscenity law in England and Wales is currently governed by the various Obscene Publications Acts, and Section 63 of the Criminal Justice and Immigration Act 2008 but obscenity laws go back much further into the English common law.

The conviction in 1727 of Edmund Curll for the publication of Venus in the Cloister or The Nun in her Smock under the common law offence of disturbing the King's peace was the first conviction for obscenity in Great Britain, and set a legal precedent for other convictions.

A defence against the charge of obscenity on the grounds of literary merit was introduced in the Obscene Publications Act 1959. The OPA was tested in the high-profile obscenity trial brought against Penguin Books for publishing Lady Chatterley's Lover (by D. H. Lawrence) in 1960. The book was found to have merit, and Penguin Books was found not guilty – a ruling which granted far more freedom to publish explicit material. This trial did not establish the 'merit' defence as an automatic right; several controversial books and publications were the subject of British court cases throughout the 1960s and into the 1970s. Last Exit to Brooklyn, a 1964 novel by American author Hubert Selby, Jr. was subject of a private prosecution in 1966.

The distinction between legal erotic literature and illegal pornography was traditionally made in the English-speaking courts on the basis of perceived literary merit. No prosecutions of purely textual pornography took place following the Inside Linda Lovelace trial of 1976 until October 2008 when a man was charged (but later cleared) under the Obscene Publications Act for allegedly posting fictional written material to the Internet describing kidnap, rape and murder of pop group Girls Aloud (the R v Walker trial). In late August 2005, the government announced that it planned to criminalise possession of extreme pornographic material, rather than just publication, and the law came into force as Section 63 of the Criminal Justice and Immigration Act 2008.

Under a law introduced in May 2015, not only creation but also possession of manuals giving advice how to groom or abuse children is also outlawed.

Almost all adult stores in the UK are forbidden from having their goods in open display under the Indecent Displays Act 1981, which means the shop fronts are often boarded up or covered in posters. A warning sign must be clearly shown at the entrance to the store, and no items can be visible from the street. No customer can be under eighteen years old. The Video Recordings Act 1984 introduced the R18-rated classification for videos that are only available in licensed sex shops, but hardcore pornographic magazines are available in newsagents in some places. The Ann Summers chain of lingerie and sex shops recently won the right to advertise for workers in job centres, which was originally banned under restrictions on what advertising could be carried out by the sex industry.

Stage licensing 

Censorship of stage plays was exercised by the Master of the Revels in England by about 1600 until the English Civil War in 1642.

In 1737, partly as a result of political attacks by Henry Fielding against Robert Walpole, Parliament enacted a law that established "the Examiner of the Stage" (an official in the Lord Chamberlain's office) to censor plays on the basis of both politics and morals (i.e. sexual impropriety, blasphemy, and foul language). Plays had to be licensed by the Lord Chamberlain. In 1737, through the influence of the Duke of Grafton, the Shakespearian commentator Edward Capell was appointed with an annual salary of £200 as deputy-examiner of plays. This censorship by licensing requirement was finally abolished by the Theatres Act 1968.

According to Rufus Osgood Mason (who gives an example of a written license from 1814):

Charles Kemble, later in life, received the appointment of "Examiner of Plays". The duties consisted in reading the plays which had been accepted by the managers of the different theatres, to see that they contained nothing objectionable either on the score of politics or morals. Those that were approved were reported to the Lord Chamberlain who issued the license.

Libel law

England and Wales have relatively strict libel laws ("defamation" in Scotland) in that they are often considered pro plaintiff with the defendant asked to prove that they did not commit libel. Compensation awards for libel are also unlimited, in contrast to those for personal injury. Further controversy surrounds the libel laws with regard to costs. Whilst costs can be awarded the ability both to bring and to defend libel cases is often considered to be restricted to the wealthy. Conversely it is possible to initiate a "no win – no fee" case against a wealthy individual or organisation if the individual bringing the case has insignificant assets as even if the case is lost the wealthy individual or organisation are unable to recover their costs. Typically in such cases an out of court settlement is forced upon the wealthy individual or organisation.

A recent example is the case of Simon Singh's lawsuit, where author and journalist Simon Singh was sued by the British Chiropractic Association for criticism of chiropractic therapy which rested on a summary of recent scientific research. Singh has been able to pursue a legal defence because of his earnings from four best-sellers.

In another case the UK based academic publisher Equinox was forced to remove a peer reviewed academic article from its publication International Journal of Speech, Language and the Law. The article "charlatanry in forensic speech science" was a metastudy of lie detector research and came to the conclusion that lie detectors don't work. The Israeli manufacturer of lie detectors Nemesysco forced the publisher to remove the already published article from the online databases and the journal was also forced to publish an apology in a later issue.

On 15 March 2011, a "Draft Defamation Bill" (CP3/11) was published by the Ministry of Justice with an accompanying "consultation paper containing provisions for reforming the law to strike the right balance between protection of freedom of speech and protection of reputation". (Close date: 10 June 2011) The Defamation Act 2013 reformed English defamation law on issues of the right to freedom of expression and the protection of reputation. It also comprised a response to perceptions that the law as it stood was giving rise to libel tourism and other inappropriate claims.

Blasphemy law

Blasphemy against Christianity was long an important part of British censorship, with the unwritten common law containing an offence of blasphemous libel. Prosecutions were rare, however, the last one being the 1977 Gay News legal case Whitehouse v. Lemon.  Later developments around the turn of the 21st century put the continued viability of blasphemy prosecutions in doubt.  The offence was definitively abolished on 8 May 2008.

Critics claimed the Racial and Religious Hatred Act 2006 could hinder freedom of speech. Leaders of major religions as well as non-religious groups such as the National Secular Society and English PEN spoke out in order to campaign against the Bill. Comedians and satirists also fear prosecution for their work. However, a late amendment to the Act as a result of these campaigns reads: "Nothing in this Part shall be read or given effect in a way which prohibits or restricts discussion, criticism or expressions of antipathy, dislike, ridicule, insult or abuse of particular religions or the beliefs or practices of their adherents, or of any other belief system or the beliefs or practices of its adherents, or proselytising or urging adherents of a different religion or belief system to cease practising their religion or belief system."

National security
There are several Acts of the United Kingdom Parliament for the protection of official information, mainly related to national security. The latest revision is the Official Secrets Act 1989 (1989 chapter 6), which removed the public interest defence by repealing section 2 of the Official Secrets Act 1911. In 2004, a memo containing details of a possible US bombing of broadcaster Al Jazeera was leaked to the press. Attorney General Peter Goldsmith warned newspapers that they could be prosecuted under the Official Secrets Act if they publish the contents of the memo, saying "You are reminded that to publish the contents of a document which is known to have been unlawfully disclosed by a crown servant is in itself a breach of section 5 of the Official Secrets Act 1989".

The Terrorism Act 2000 makes it an offence to collect or possess, and as amended in 2019 also to access, information likely to be of use to a terrorist. Bilal Zaheer Ahmad, 23, from Wolverhampton, is believed to be the first person convicted of collecting information likely to be of use to a terrorist, including the al-Qaeda publication Inspire. Since then, Ben Raymond of the group National Action has also been convicted, among other charges, of possession of terrorist information, including Anders Breivik's manifesto and a guide to homemade detonators.

The Terrorism Act 2006 makes it an offence to "glorify" terrorism. There are concerns that this could limit free speech.

DSMA-Notices (Defence and Security Media Advisory Notice, formerly a DA-Notice) are official but voluntary requests to news editors not to publish items on specified subjects, for reasons of national security.

Prior restraint
Beyond obscenity law, there have been a number of organisations whose main function was to approve material prior to distribution.

Plays and theatres had long been licensed by the Crown prior to 1737. Licensure of a playhouse, however, only gave a general patent. The crown had no ability to censor before plays were performed. Under the provisions of the Theatrical Licensing Act of 1737 as extended by the Theatres Act 1843, the Lord Chamberlain's Office was able to censor plays. This role continued until the Theatres Act 1968 abolished the practice following several causes célèbres, and a long campaign by the theatre critic Kenneth Tynan among others.

The British Board of Film Classification is the de facto film censor for films in the United Kingdom; since films not rated by the BBFC cannot be shown in most cinemas, or distributed as videos or DVDs, lack of BBFC approval generally makes productions of such films uneconomic.
In the case of films shown in cinemas, local authorities have the final legal say about who can watch a particular film. Almost always local authorities accept the Board's recommendation for a certificate for a film.
Under the Video Recording Act 1984, almost all video recordings must be classified by an authority chosen by the Home Secretary. This classification is then legally binding. Since the introduction of the Act, the BBFC has been the chosen authority. Certain works such as those that are related to sport, religion or which are designed to educate can be exempt from classification by the BBFC under the act.

Up until 2007, the Broadcast Advertising Clearance Centre pre-approved most British television advertising (under Ofcom rules, other broadcasters can also approve their own advertising content, but most rely on the BACC). The Advertising Standards Authority is the regulatory advertising body, but can only prevent the republication of advertisements after upholding complaints from the general public.

The advent of the Internet access has made the act of censorship more difficult, and there has been a relaxation of censorship in recognition of this. BBFC guidelines have been relaxed further to allow the limited distribution of hardcore pornography under an R18 certificate, partially because of this, and partially because of a recognition that public attitudes have changed. Further confirmation of this change in attitude was provided by the French film Baise-moi, which was given an 18 certificate despite showing scenes of unsimulated sexual activity.

Ofcom is now the regulatory body for UK television, radio, and telecommunications services since the abolition of the Independent Television Commission. Ofcom exerts its powers under the Communications Act 2003. The government's new requirements for Ofcom only require it to ensure adherence to "generally accepted standards" and prevention of harm, removing the former requirement to adhere to standards of "taste and decency".

Worldwide Press Freedom Index, published by Reporters Without Borders, gave the United Kingdom a score of 5.17, making it 24th.

Self-regulation of publication
A number of industries carry out what is known as self-regulation. Self-regulation seeks to keep content within the bounds of what is publicly acceptable, thus preventing government intervention to bring about official regulation. Some of the areas they are concerned about include obscenity, slander and libel. There is no clear line between self-regulation in matters of expression and self-censorship.

In 2019, intelligence researcher James Flynn reported an example of self-regulation resulting in the cancelled publication of a book about censorship itself. Flynn's book, In Defence of Free Speech was originally accepted by Emerald Insight but later rejected over concerns that there was a "significant possibility of legal action" under the UK's hate speech and libel laws. Douglas Murray criticised this decision and compared it to the 2006 controversy that prevented Alms for Jihad from being published in the United Kingdom.

Industry self-regulatory bodies include the Advertising Standards Authority. In the wake of the Leveson Inquiry the Press Complaints Commission (PCC), which had been the main industry regulator of the press in the United Kingdom since 1990, was wound up and most national newspapers now belong to the Independent Press Standards Organisation, established in 2014, refusing to sign up to IMPRESS, the Leveson-compliant alternative.

Parliamentary footage 
Proceedings of the House of Lords, House of Commons, and various Parliamentary Committees are broadcast on BBC Parliament and Parliament's Web site. The Rules of Coverage released by the House of Commons Broadcasting Committee place severe limitations on the use of this footage, including a prohibition of its use in the context of political satire. For this reason, rebroadcasts of foreign comedy shows containing Parliamentary footage are restricted from broadcast in the UK, or the footage removed or replaced, often to comic effect.

Censorship by medium

Art 
Art was often used as propaganda in Europe, often to point out political scandals but also to spread patriotism in times of need. More specifically, caricature was often used to satirise these events and people and bring attention to the artists' perspectives. Although censorship laws changed based on the stability of the monarchy and their opinions of the citizens, Britain was one of the European countries with the least amount of censorship in this area. During the French Revolution, Britain was in fact the only country where such propaganda was free and legal. The most famous British caricaturists at the time included Isaac Cruikshank, James Gillray, and Thomas Rowlandson. Although all three caricaturists had different perspectives and opinions, they were the frontrunners in the push towards patriotism of the United Kingdom when the UK faced attack from Napoleon.

Film

Internet

Although freedom of expression and protection of privacy over the Internet is guaranteed by UK law, since about 2010 there has been an increasing shift towards authoritarian measures such as increased surveillance (The United Kingdom has more police surveillance cameras than anywhere else outside of China) and police action. Combating terrorism and preventing child abuse have been widely used by state agencies and private commercial actors (e.g. Internet service providers) to justify the implementation of interception and direct filtering measures. Nevertheless, in 2010 the OpenNet Initiative (ONI) found no evidence of technical filtering in the political, social, conflict/security, or Internet tools areas. The UK openly blocks child pornography websites, for which ONI does not test.

98.6% of UK internet traffic consume a service called the child abuse image content list which uses data provided by the Internet Watch Foundation to identify pages judged to contain indecent photographs of children. When such a page is found, the system creates a "URL not found page" error rather than deliver the actual page or a warning page.

In July and again in October 2011, the UK High Court ruled that BT Retail must block access to a website (newzbin.com) which "provides links to pirated movies". In September 2011, in response to the court ruling and with encouragement from government, leading UK ISPs are reported to have privately agreed in principle to quickly restrict access to websites when presented with court orders. In May 2012 the High Court ordered UK ISPs to block The Pirate Bay to prevent further copyright infringing movie and music downloads facilitated by the website. Soon after, the High Court ordered UK ISPs to block other websites linking to, or endorsing online "piracy", such as KickAss Torrents (kat.ph).

Since the end of 2013 a rolling program has been in place to ensure that most households in the UK have pornography and other material (such as suicide, alcohol and violence-related content) filtered from the Internet by default unless a household chooses to receive it. This follows an announcement by the Prime Minister David Cameron on 22 July 2013.

In addition to Internet filtering, the UK also prosecutes those who are alleged to be violating hate speech laws online. In particular, the Communications Act 2003 outlaws the act of sending "by means of a public electronic communications network a message or other matter that is grossly offensive or of an indecent, obscene or menacing character". In 2017, Alison Saunders, the director of public prosecution, announced the allocation of additional resources for enforcing it and the intent to treat online speech as equivalent to a conversation in person. In 2018, the Sentencing Council began deliberating on whether to increase the maximum sentence for suspects with many social media followers. Digital secretary Margot James also outlined a plan to increase government regulation of social networks with possible penalties including 4% of the firm's global turnover. Culture secretary Matt Hancock elaborated on this plan and likened it to the controversial German law NetzDG. He was criticised  for saying that a refusal by ten technology companies to send representatives to a meeting he held gave him "a big impetus to drive these proposals to legislate through". As of 2017, it was estimated that nine people per day were being arrested for online speech and other various thought crimes within the UK, with five leading to convictions.

Some regulation of the Internet is coordinated through an online police presence. The Metropolitan Police Service's Twitter account for example, which has been online since 2009, has been applauded for its responsiveness. It has also been condemned for what critics see as police intimidation. In 2016, former IT consultant Paul Perrin expressed resentment over the level of attention given to LGBT issues in the news. When an officer from an LGBT-specific account of the MPS joined the discussion, he or she allegedly revealed knowledge of Perrin's family members.

Age verification

Since March 2019, the Digital Economy Act 2017 has given the government power to require certain websites to implement an age verification scheme, under rules defined in the Online Pornography (Commercial Basis) Regulations 2019. , reports state that there is no firm date for the implementation of this policy, which has been beset by many technical problems. A BBC report described implementation of the scheme as being "in a holding pattern".

Literature
See also under "Laws on obscenity and sexual content" above.

In 1873, controversy over the depiction of William Ewart Gladstone, Robert Lowe, 1st Viscount Sherbrooke, and Acton Smee Ayrton in W. S. Gilbert and Gilbert Arthur à Beckett's The Happy Land led to the play's licence being revoked by the Lord Chamberlain. A censored version of the play was eventually allowed to be performed, but uncensored scripts, with the censored portions printed in all capital letters, were printed by the theatre's manager. The play became a smash hit.

The novel Ulysses by James Joyce was banned in the United Kingdom in 1922 when it was declared obscene.

Novelist George Orwell wrote several articles on censorship including an item titled The Freedom of the Press in 1943. It appears that this was a preface for his book Animal Farm, but it is unclear if it had been deliberately suppressed or if Orwell himself chose not to publish it.

Any fair-minded person with journalistic experience will admit that during this war official censorship has not been particularly irksome. We have not been subjected to the kind of totalitarian 'co-ordination' that it might have been reasonable to expect. The press has some justified grievances, but on the whole the Government has behaved well and has been surprisingly tolerant of minority opinions. The sinister fact about literary censorship in England is that it is largely voluntary. – George Orwell

Orwell went on to suggest that because both the UK and the Soviet Union were members of the Allied powers at the time, this self-censorship was preventing valid criticism of the Communist regime. Orwell worked for the Ministry of Information during the war and used it as his inspiration for the Ministry of Truth in Nineteen Eighty-Four.

Radio
Censorship of music on the airwaves was in effect the power of the BBC. (A full list of songs banned on the BBC can be seen here: List of songs banned by the BBC.) Some songs were banned for containing sexually explicit lyrics, or promoting the use of drugs. Some songs were banned for political reasons such as Paul McCartney and Wings song "Give Ireland Back to the Irish" in the 1970s, or in the 1980s Christy Moore's, "Back home in Derry" since it was written by Bobby Sands.

In 1949, the "BBC Variety Programmes Policy Guide For Writers and Producers" (commonly known as "the Green Book") was issued by the BBC to its producers and writers of comedy. Among things absolutely banned were jokes about lavatories, effeminacy in men, immorality of any kind, suggestive references to honeymoon couples, chambermaids, fig leaves, ladies' underwear (e.g. "winter draws on"), prostitution, and the vulgar use of words such as "basket". The guidelines also stipulated that "such words as God, Good God, My God, Blast, Hell, Damn, Bloody, Gorblimey, Ruddy, etc etc should be deleted from scripts and innocuous expressions substituted."

In April 2013, after the death of Margaret Thatcher, the song Ding Dong! The Witch Is Dead from the 1939 film The Wizard of Oz, rose to number two in the BBC Radio 1 UK singles chart as many people bought the song to celebrate the former PM's death. The BBC refused to air the full song however, with only a small clip being played on the hit chart show.

Television
During The Troubles in Northern Ireland the BBC, ITV and Channel 4 regularly stopped or postponed the broadcast of documentaries relating to Ireland. A Real Lives documentary for the BBC, At the Edge of the Union, was temporarily blocked in August 1985 by direct government intervention from the then Home Secretary Leon Brittan which led to a one-day strike by the National Union of Journalists to defend the independence of the BBC.

From November 1988 to September 1994, the voices of Irish republicans and Loyalist paramilitaries were barred by the British government from British television and radio. This necessitated the use by broadcasters of an actor 'revoicing' the words which had been spoken by interviewees or at public meetings by the affected groups. The case of After Dark – "the most uncensorable programme in the history of British television" – is also relevant, specifically the unmade edition of the programme in 1988 with Gerry Adams. The ban was lifted a fortnight after the first Provisional Irish Republican Army ceasefire, on 16 September 1994. The ban could not be enforced for the duration of election campaigns.

An international academic conference on censorship noted other "After Dark case histories which bear on issues of censorship include the intelligence services, drugs, freemasonry, sex ... and Oliver Reed."

Video games
The introduction of controversial video games featuring photo-realistic images, such as Mortal Kombat and Night Trap, led to calls from the tabloid press for games to fall under the Video Recordings Act. The UK games publisher trade body ELSPA responded by introducing a voluntary age rating system in 1994. The ELSPA ratings were succeeded by PEGI in 2003.

Nevertheless, although games are generally exempt from the Video Recordings Act, those depicting sexual content, or gross violence towards people or animals, must still be submitted to the BBFC for consideration. BBFC ratings are legally binding, and British law imposes stiff penalties on retailers who sell to under-aged customers. However, the Act was discovered in August 2009 to be unenforceable. The rating system is to be reviewed as part of the Digital Britain project.

Carmageddon, in which the gameplay involved mowing down innocent pedestrians, was the first game to be refused classification in 1997, effectively banning it from sale. The game's publisher, SCI, had a modified version created in which the pedestrians in question were replaced by green-blooded zombies, which completed a successful appeal against the BBFC to overturn their original decision. The uncensored, unmodified version of Carmageddon was later released under an 18-certificate.

In 2002 the IO Interactive game Hitman 2: Silent Assassin was withdrawn by a number of retailers due to religious sensitivities. The area in question involved a Sikh sect that were depicted as terrorists involved in arms smuggling and assassination. It also involved a section that many Sikhs believed to closely resemble the 1984 massacre at the Amritsar temple.

In 2004, the parents of a murdered 14-year-old boy blamed Manhunt as having been "connected" to the murder. It was later found not to be, as the game was found in the victim's home, rather than the killer's. Leicestershire police "did not uncover any connections to the computer game".  The accusations prompted some retailers to remove the game from their shelves.  Nevertheless, following this incident the sales of the game rose due to the free publicity from newspaper headlines.
The sequel, Manhunt 2, released in 2007, was banned from being sold in the UK by the BBFC. On appeal to the Video Appeals Committee this ruling was overturned however the BBFC launched a successful judicial review into the VAC's decision, forcing the VAC to reconsider its judgment.  On 14 March 2008, the VAC again recommended that the game be released, a position to which the BBFC agreed. The game is now available.

Specific cases studies
In 1795, the administration of William Pitt (the Younger) enacted the Treason Act and Seditious Meetings Act to suppress the burgeoning Radical movement calling for Parliamentary reform. Fearing a "Jacobin uprising" of the kind that had just been seen in France, the government censured reform societies such as the London Corresponding Society, despite no evidence suggesting that these organisations engaged in any illegal activities.
 In 1963, in the Profumo affair, the government instituted criminal proceedings against Stephen Ward to stifle press comment under the sub judice rule concerning the sexual relationship between the War Minister John Profumo and Christine Keeler, who was having a sexual relationship with Yevgeny Ivanov, a Soviet Naval Attache and alleged spy.
 In 1972, Lord Longford and Raymond Blackburn decided to pursue a matter of pornography classification for the film Language of Love into the Court of Appeal of Lord Denning, MR, and lost the writ of mandamus against the Police Commissioner, who had refused to intrude upon the BBFC remit.
 In 1977, the Sex Pistols' single God Save the Queen was "the subject of a blanket ban on BBC".
In 1985, the British government attempted to ban the book Spycatcher by MI5 officer Peter Wright because of the sensitive material it contained. Several British newspapers attempted to report on its principal allegations, but were served with gag orders. They persisted and were tried for contempt of court, charges that were later dropped.
In 1994, 6 members of LGBT rights group OutRage! protested against 6,000 members of Islamist group Hizb ut-Tahrir at Wembley Arena. The counter-protestors were arrested for displaying placards in support of gays, Jews and women.
In 1995, Prince Charles obtained a court injunction that prevented his former housekeeper Wendy Berry from publishing her tell-all book about his marital troubles. After publishing her book "The Housekeepers Diary" in the United States, Berry left the UK to avoid contempt-of-court charges.
In 1999, 78-year old veteran George Staunton from Liverpool displayed advertisements for the UK Independence Party bearing the slogans "Free speech for England" and "Remember 1939-1945". He was arrested and charged with racially aggravated criminal damages but the charges were later dropped.
In July 2001, 25-year old Daryl Barke, whose bakery had been in the family for 22 years was forced to remove a sign advertising that the store's bread was "none of that French rubbish". The police stated that they were investigating the sign under the Race Relations Act 1976 in response to an anonymous complaint. Barke protested that Essex police officers who shop at the bakery and a French Algerian greengrocer working on the same block all enjoyed the joke.
In October 2001, Harry Hammond held up a sign reading "Jesus Gives Peace, Jesus is Alive, Stop Immorality, Stop Homosexuality, Stop Lesbianism, Jesus is Lord". Nearby demonstrators attempted to physically remove the sign. None of them were charged but Hammond was convicted of breaching section 5 of the Public Order Act 1986 and fined £300 with £395 in costs. Attempts to appeal were unsuccessful as Hammond died shortly after the trial.
In December 2004, controversy surrounding the play Behzti sparked violent protests leading to the play's cancellation. A controversial scene set in a Sikh temple included rape, physical abuse, and murder. Some members of the Sikh community found the play deeply offensive to their faith.
In 2006, 21-year old Sam Brown from Belfast was arrested for walking up to police while inebriated and asking "Excuse me, do you realise your horse is gay?" The police argued that these were homophobic remarks and tried to charge him under section 5 of the Public Order Act 1986. The charges were later dropped.
British National Party leader Nick Griffin and activist Mark Collett were found unanimously not guilty of charges of inciting racial hatred in November 2006. The pair had been secretly recorded making statements about Islam and immigration in a 2004 documentary.
In 2007, 19-year old Kyle Little from Newcastle was fined a total of £200 for barking at a Labrador dog and saying "woof" near police. He had his conviction overturned later that year with the judge remarking that "the law is not an ass".
On 15 January 2008 it was announced that the trial of Wang Yam, accused of murdering Allan Chappelow, would be held in camera on the grounds of the administration of justice and national security. This was the first UK murder trial held behind closed doors. The UK press were prohibited from speculating as to the reasons for this order.
In 2008, the poem Education for Leisure was removed from the AQA Anthology, after complaints were received. The poem explores the mind of a person who is planning to commit a murder.
Starting in 2008 the press were barred from printing the names of concerned parties in the murder of Baby Peter, a 17-month-old boy. Websites which published the names of the defendants and the boy came under police investigation for conducting an "internet hate campaign". On 10 August 2009 the ban was lifted.
The Twitter joke trial, which took place between 2009 and 2012, centered on a complaint by Paul Chambers about Robin Hood Airport being closed. It read "You've got a week and a bit to get your shit together otherwise I'm blowing the airport sky high!!" Chambers was convicted of breaching the Communications Act 2003 before getting the verdict overturned on his third appeal. Public figures, including Nick Cohen, Graham Linehan and Stephen Fry supported Chambers. The final ruling read "a message which does not create fear or apprehension in those to whom it is communicated, or who may reasonably be expected to see it, falls outside this provision".
In March 2010, American Baptist preacher Shawn Holes was convicted of a breach of peace for remarks made in Glasgow. He opined "homosexuals are deserving of the wrath of God, and so are all other sinners, and they are going to a place called hell" in response to a question before the police received a complaint. The Catholic Church in Scotland and the Muslim Council of Scotland opposed the prosecution.
In April 2010, Baptist preacher Dale McAlpine was questioned by a police community support officer for the LGBT population and later arrested by another officer. The arrest concerned his pronouncement that homosexuality was sinful, which McAlpine says was not in his sermon but part of a conversation he had with a listener. After holding him in a cell for seven hours, Cumbria police released McAlpine and dropped the charges stating that they respected freedom of expression.
In 2011, a series of privacy injunctions, so called 'super injunctions', gained widespread attention. The press was barred from publishing details about various prominent individuals. One case involving journalist and broadcaster Andrew Marr was dropped; another involving footballer Ryan Giggs became untenable, although many such injunctions remain in force.
In July 2011, highlights from The Daily Show, an American TV program, were not shown on Channel 4's More4 channel because showing coverage of the House of Commons in a comedic or satirical context in Britain is prohibited by parliamentary rules. American viewers were able to see the material.
In September 2011, public preacher John Craven was approached by two male teenagers and asked for his views on homosexuality. He allegedly declined to give his own views but stated that homosexual acts were considered sinful in The Bible. According to reports, the boys subsequently kissed in front of Craven and reported him to a nearby officer. Craven was detained for at least fifteen hours. He stated that he was held "without food or water" and that his access to medication for rheumatoid arthritis was interrupted. Three years later, he was awarded £13,000 in compensation under the Human Rights Act 1998.
In October 2011, 28-year old Stephen Birrell was sentenced to eight months in jail for engaging in Scottish sectarianism. He made posts to a Facebook page called "Neil Lennon should be banned" which insulted Catholics and the Pope. Sheriff Bill Totten stated "the right-thinking people of Glasgow and Scotland will not allow any behaviour of this nature".
In January 2012, British communications regulator Ofcom revoked Press TV's licence to broadcast in the UK; it remains available via the internet. Ofcom found that the News channel's editorial control was based in Tehran, which breaches the Communications Act 2003. This had come to their attention while investigating a Press TV interview with journalist Maziar Bahari, given under duress, in which he 'confessed' that western journalists working in Iran were spies. A connection has been made by opponents of the decision with WikiLeaks cables suggesting the US and UK governments wanted to end Press TV's broadcasting licence in response to the Iranian government's jamming of the BBC Persian Service and the Voice of America.
 In March 2012, 20-year old Azhar Ahmed was arrested for writing "all soldiers should die and go to hell" on Facebook. The post was reported by the mother of a soldier who had been killed by an IED in Afghanistan two days earlier. District Judge Jane Goodwin called it "beyond the pale of what's tolerable in our society" and sentenced Ahmed to £300 and 240 hours of community service. Several attendees protested when she delivered the ruling and Paul Chambers, having been acquitted in the Twitter joke trial said "Glad all that fighting wasn't for nothing."
 In May 2012, 21-year old Liam Stacey spent 56 days in jail for tweeting "LOL, Fuck Muamba. He's dead." The line referred to English footballer Fabrice Muamba after a cardiac arrest which led to his retirement. After a large influx of criticism from other Twitter users, Stacey argued back with racial insults including "go pick some cotton". He was charged under the Public Order Act 1986 and apologised for the comments.
 During the 2012 Olympics, diver Tom Daley retweeted a message that said "You let your dad down i hope you know that", insulting him for finishing fourth. Its 17-year old author was arrested on suspicion of "malicious communication" and given a harassment warning.
 In August 2012, following publication of naked photographs of Prince Harry, lawyers for his father, Prince Charles, issued threats of legal action. The photographs were not used by British newspapers or television stations after St James's Palace warned that the royal family regarded the pictures as a gross invasion of the prince's privacy.
 In September 2012, Britain's royal household began legal proceedings against a French magazine, Closer, that published paparazzi photographs of Kate Middleton, the Duchess of Cambridge and wife of Prince William. And on 18 September a French court ordered the magazine to hand over all digital copies of the topless photos within 24 hours and blocked further publication of what it called a "brutal display" of the couple's private moments. The case is the first of two legal actions, St. James's Palace said that family lawyers would also be filing a criminal complaint.
 In October 2012, 19-year old Matthew Woods was jailed for 12 weeks because of jokes he made about two abducted children April Jones and Madeleine McCann. The messages, including "Who in their right mind would abduct a ginger kid?" were copied from Sickipedia and posted to Facebook. Although Woods was initially threatened with violence and detained for his own safety, prosecutors decided to charge him with sending a grossly offensive message, to which he pleaded guilty. Judge Bill Hudson opined that "there was no other sentence this court could have passed which conveys to you the abhorrence that many in society feel this crime should receive."
 Also in October 2012, paroled criminal Barry Thew was sentenced to eight months in prison for wearing a T-shirt that expressed approval of police officers being murdered. This occurred shortly after the murder of Nicola Hughes and Fiona Bone.

 In November 2012, Linford House, 19, was arrested in Canterbury under the Malicious Communications Act 1988 for posting a picture of a burning poppy on Facebook on Remembrance Sunday, accompanied by a message calling military personnel (squaddies) an offensive word.  The act makes it a crime to send anything "indecent or grossly offensive, or which conveys a threat … [where] there is an intent to cause distress or anxiety to the recipient". Nick Pickles, the director of the campaign group Big Brother Watch, argued: "Kent police need to urgently release this man and drop an utterly ridiculous investigation into something that has harmed no one." The teenager was not charged after he met and apologised to serving and former military personnel. 

 Between July and August 2013, The Guardian newspaper was subject to prior restraint as well as property destruction by members of GCHQ following its publication of documents relating to PRISM, the NSA and Edward Snowden.
 From October 2013, The existence of the criminal case R v Incedal and Rarmoul-Bouhadjar was a complete secret until an application made by The Guardian newspaper. However, the details of the evidence involved and why the defendants were acquitted are still censored. The case involved Erol Incedal and Mounir Rarmoul-Bouhadjar who were charged under the Terrorism Act 2000 and the Terrorism Act 2006. "Accredited journalists" who were allowed to report the trial were denied possession of their physical reports (notebooks) and will be imprisoned if they publicly report their findings. The gagging order was upheld in February 2016 and censorship of the case continues.
 In January 2014, The Bible: The Complete Word Of God (Abridged) by the Reduced Shakespeare Company was cancelled due to pressure from the Democratic Unionist Party and politician Billy Ball. Amnesty International condemned the campaign.
 In April 2014, Liberty GB candidate Paul Weston was arrested after being reported by an audience member at a campaign speech. The complaint objected to his remarks on Islam which were quotations from a passage by Winston Churchill. The police later dropped the charges.
 In May 2014, LGBT activist Gareth Lee requested a cake from Ashers Bakery featuring the characters Bert and Ernie and the message "support gay marriage". The owners refused, citing religious objection, and were successfully sued for £500 by the Equality Commission for Northern Ireland. The Bakery subsequently lost an appeal against the ruling. Columnist Kenan Malik criticised compelled speech and stated that the bakers did not break the law because they did not refuse service to Lee or any other gay customer. Activist Peter Tatchell adopted this view after supporting the lawsuit previously. In October 2018, the Supreme Court of the United Kingdom ruled unanimously the bakers did not refuse to fulfill the customer's order because of his sexual orientation and would have refused to make a cake with this message for any customer, irrespective of their sexual orientation. Therefore, the Court ruled there was no discrimination on the grounds of the sexual orientation.
 In December 2014, 19-year old Ross Loraine was arrested and cited for making light of the 2014 Glasgow bin lorry crash on Twitter. The tweet, which he deleted shortly after posting, stated that after the driver's vehicle struck pedestrians, this was "the most trash it has picked up in one day".
 In March 2015, 24-year old Scott Lamont was sentenced to spend four months in jail for singing Billy Boys at a Rangers FC game. Sheriff Paul Crozier stated "This sort of behaviour will not be tolerated, certainly not by me." Author Mick Hume condemned the Offensive Behaviour at Football Act under which Lamont was charged.
 In 2015, 78-year old pastor James McConnell went on trial for making a speech in Belfast which described Islam as "satanic" and "heathen". Prosecutors argued that the speech was contrary to the Communications Act 2003 but he was eventually acquitted.
 In 2016, 23-year old Rowan O'Connell was fined £275 with costs of £115 for self-described trolling that he performed on Reddit. The anonymous post insulted Mzee Mohammed, who had died that year in police custody, by calling him a "good for nothing, spice smoking Toxteth monkey".
 In April 2016, Scottish YouTuber Mark Meechan uploaded a video showing how he had trained his dog to raise its paw (similar to a Nazi salute) in response to Meechan saying "sieg heil" and "gas the Jews".  Meechan was arrested after sharing the video, with the video having been seen more than three millions times before it was removed by YouTube. Meechan said the video was intended to annoy his girlfriend. Meechan was supported in court by former English Defence League leader Tommy Robinson. On 20 March 2018, the court convicted him of a hate crime under the Communications Act 2003, describing the material as "grossly offensive". Tory MP Philip Davies requested a review of freedom of expression in parliament in response to the conviction. Comedians Ricky Gervais and David Baddiel tweeted in support of Meechan. Tom Walker, Shappi Khorsandi, and Stephen Fry defended Meechan and criticised other comedians for their silence on the issue. Meechan, who plans to appeal, was sentenced to pay an £800 fine ( which he refused to pay. The money was later seized from his bank account) on 23 April 2018. A crowd of about 500 people protested the move in London.
 In 2017, 19-year old Croxteth resident Chelsea Russell quoted a line from Snap Dogg's song "I'm Trippin'" on her Instagram page. The line, which read "Kill a snitch nigga, rob a rich nigga", was copied from a friend's page as part of a tribute to Frankie Murphy who was killed in a car accident at age 13. Hate crime investigators were alerted to the presence of the slur and charged Russell with "sending a grossly offensive message by means of a public electronic communications network". Defence lawyer Carole Clarke stated that she received a request from one of the arresting officers that the word "nigga", the subject of the trial, not be used in court. In April 2018, District Judge Jack McGarva found Russell guilty and delivered a sentence which included a £585 fine, a curfew and an ankle monitoring bracelet. However, this was overturned on appeal in February 2019.
 In March 2018, Humanists UK criticised Yesodey Hatorah Senior Girls' School for censoring references to sexual orientation and women's liberation in their class materials. A description of Roe v Wade was redacted from a history textbook and homosexuals were removed from the list of groups targeted by the Holocaust. Ofsted indicated that it would take this criticism into account when investigating the publicly funded school.
 In June 2018, the television show Last Week Tonight with John Oliver was not permitted to broadcast a segment about Brexit in the UK, as the clip contained scenes of debate in the House of Commons. John Oliver, calling the restriction "genuinely insane and frankly antidemocratic", replaced the clip in the UK broadcast with Gilbert Gottfried reading three-star Yelp reviews of Boise, Idaho, restaurants.
 In June 2018, Kingston upon Thames Crown Court imposed a Criminal Behaviour Order on five members of UK drill group 1011. The order restricts them from mentioning death or injury in their songs and requires them to notify police of video uploads 24 hours in advance and performances 48 hours in advance. The men, aged between 17 and 21, had previously been arrested with police saying that they planned to attack rival group 12 World with machetes and baseball bats. The 1011 members stated that the objects were props for a music video but pleaded guilty to conspiracy to commit violent disorder. Liberty and Index on Censorship both announced opposition the order. Youth worker Ciaran Thapar criticised it as ineffective while solicitor Elena Papamichael compared it to "blaming rock groups for drug use".
 In August 2018, transgender rights activist Giuliana Kendal brought a private prosecution against feminist activist Linda Bellos for discussing the possibility of a fight between Bellos and her political opponents.
 In October 2018, screenwriter Graham Linehan was given a "verbal harassment warning" for making Twitter posts that deadnamed transgender activist Stephanie Hayden. The exchange arose from a debate over whether legal recognition of a gender transition should require a medical opinion.
 In January 2019, community cohesion officer Mansoor Gul questioned Lincolnshire ex-police officer Harry Miller over the fact that he had retweeted a poem that condemned gender transitions. While confirming that no crime had been committed, Gul stated that it qualified as a "hate incident" and told Miller that his employer might be displeased. Miller also reported that he heard the line "we need to check your thinking". Conservative MPs including Boris Johnson and Martin Vickers criticised the police response. Miller subsequently launched a legal challenge which concluded in February 2020. The judge's ruling condemned the police for interfering with protected speech.
 In 2021, Viscount Portman was sentenced and jailed for calling a male 'Jewish Scum.'  
In July 2022, British army veteran Darren Brady, was arrested "on suspicion of sending by public communication network an offensive, indecent, obscene, menacing message"  for allegedly retweeting an image of the "Progress Pride Flag" arranged into a swastika. No further action was taken, and the arrest was later criticised by the Hampshire police and crime commissioner Donna Jones.
In September 2022, a British woman was arrested and charged for holding up an "abolish monarchy" sign at a proclamation ceremony for King Charles III in Edinburgh. Similar arrests throughout the country around this period over anti-monarchy republican sentiment have alarmed human rights groups.

See also

 Sub judice
 1988–1994 British broadcasting voice restrictions
 Anne Dodd, imprisoned in 1728 for selling anti-ministry pamphlets
 British Board of Film Classification
 Campaign Against Censorship
 Child pornography laws in the United Kingdom
 Committee on Obscenity and Film Censorship
 Feminists Against Censorship
 Freedom of the Press
 Hate speech laws in the United Kingdom
 Index on Censorship
 International Freedom of Expression Exchange
 Libel tourism
 Mary Whitehouse, a Christian morality campaigner (founder of the National Viewers' and Listeners' Association) known for her opposition to social liberalism
 Mass surveillance in the United Kingdom
 Master of the Revels
 Mediawatch-UK (formerly the National Viewers and Listeners' Association)
 John Milton, English poet and intellectual who has been regarded among history's most influential and impassioned defenders of freedom of speech and freedom of the press
 Open Rights Group
 Public spaces protection order
 Police, Crime, Sentencing and Courts Act 2022
 Society for Individual Freedom
 Super-injunctions in English law
 Taking Liberties (film)
 Thomas Bowdler whose name is now used as the verb "bowdlerise" or "bowdlerize"
Areopagitica: A speech of Mr John Milton for the liberty of unlicensed printing to the Parliament of England

Notes

References

External links
Campaign Against Censorship
Edmund Curll and his prosecutions
  (technical analysis of Cleanfeed)
Free speech now! - a Spiked project
Index on Censorship: quarterly UK publication of intelligent writing about censorship and free speech
Liberty guide to the Obscene Publications Act
Ofcom website
OfWatch: a site critical of Ofcom* The Melon Farmers: anti-censorship website
Open Rights Group
Theatrical Bill Inspectors and the Licensing Act of 1737 
UK laws regarding prostitution updated for 2006
1942 Life magazine article with examples of photos censored by British government for wartime secrecy